VGE may refer to:
 Valéry Giscard d'Estaing (1926–2020), President of France
 Venous gas emboli, in diving
 Virtual geographic environments
 Vodafone Global Enterprise